Specific may refer to:

 Specificity (disambiguation)
 Specific, a cure or therapy for a specific illness

Law 
 Specific deterrence, focussed on an individual
 Specific finding, intermediate verdict used by a jury in determining the final verdict
 Specific jurisdiction over an out-of-state party, specific to cases that have a substantial connection to the party's in-state activity
 Order of specific performance, court order to perform a specific act

Economics, finance, and accounting
 Asset specificity, the extent to which the investments made to support a particular transaction have a higher value to that transaction than they would have if they were redeployed for any other purpose
 Specific identification (inventories), summing purchase costs of all inventory items
 Specific rate duty, duty paid at a specific amount per unit
 Specific risk, risk that affects a very small number of assets

Psychology 
 Domain specificity, theory that many aspects of cognition are supported by specialized, presumably evolutionarily specified, learning devices
 Specific developmental disorder, disorders in which development is delayed in one specific area or areas, and in which basically all other areas of development are not affected
 Specific learning disability
 Specific phobia, phobia of a specific thing or situation
 Specific social phobia, triggered only by specific social situations

Biology 
 pertaining to a species
 Specific name (botany), species name of a plant
 Specific name (zoology), species name of an animal
 Specific appetite, drive to eat foods with specific flavors or other characteristics
 Specific granule, secretory vesicle in granulocytes
 Specific immunity, to a particular pathogen
 Specific Pathogen Free, of a laboratory animal guaranteed free of particular (i.e., specific and named) pathogens

Other fields 
 A specific quantity generally means a physical quantity normalized "per unit" of something (often mass).
 SPECIFIC, The Sustainable Product Engineering Centre for Innovative Functional Industrial Coatings
 Specific creation, creationism as opposed to evolution
 Specific interval, shortest possible clockwise distance between pitch classes on the chromatic circle
 Specific integral, in calculus, eliminates the constant of integration
 Specific Physical Preparedness, being prepared for the movements in a specific physical activity (usually a sport)

See also 
 Species (disambiguation)
 Specification (disambiguation)
 Specialty (disambiguation)
 Site-specific (disambiguation)
 Language for specific purposes, has been primarily used to refer to two areas within applied linguistics